Eizō Sakuhinshū Vol. 2: Live at Budokan + is the second video release by Japanese rock band Asian Kung-Fu Generation, released on April 20, 2005 by Ki/oon Records. The two-disc video was also the band's very first live DVD, as the first disc contains live footage of the entirety of the final show of their "Tour Suihai 2004 - No!Member, November-," at Budokan, where they performed before an audience of over 10,000 people on December 5, 2004. The disc retains twenty-two songs, with tracks taken from Kimi Tsunagi Five M, Sol-fa, and Hōkai Amplifier.

The second disc contains clips from the first concert at the Shimokitazawa Shelter Club on November 2, 2004. It also includes behind-the-scenes documentary directed by Toshiaki Toyoda and filmed at Kanto Gakuin University, where AKG was originally formed, as well as outtakes from the music video for "Kimi to Iu Hana." Upon its release, the video managed to top the Oricon DVD charts for an entire month.

Track listing

Personnel 
 Masafumi Gotoh – lead vocals, rhythm guitar
 Kensuke Kita – lead guitar, backing vocals
 Takahiro Yamada – bass, backing vocals
 Kiyoshi Ijichi – drums

Charts

References

Asian Kung-Fu Generation video albums
2005 video albums
Live video albums
2005 live albums
Albums recorded at the Nippon Budokan